Olivia Tirmarche Molina (born 25 September 1980) is a Spanish actress.

Biography
Olivia Tirmarche Molina was born on 25 September 1980 in Ibiza, Balearic Islands. She is the daughter of Spanish actress Ángela Molina and French photographer Hervé Tirmarche. She is the oldest of six siblings. Her mother's family is an entertainment dynasty. She is the niece of actors Paula, Miguel, Mónica, and Noel Molina and the granddaughter of singer Antonio Molina.

Personal life
Molina has two children with actor Sergio Mur. The two met in 2010 on the set of Fisica o Quimica.

Career

Film

Television

Theater 
 Un enemigo del pueblo (2007)
 De repente, el último verano (2006)
 El Graduado (2005)
 El adefesio (2003)
 Fashion feeling music (2001)
 La casa de Bernarda Alba (2000)

References

External links

1980 births
Living people
Spanish stage actresses
Spanish film actresses
Spanish television actresses
People from Ibiza
21st-century Spanish actresses